Kal Malai-ye Jowkar (also Romanized as Kal Malā’ī-ye Jowkār; also known as Kal Malā’ī) is a village in Margown Rural District, Margown District, Boyer-Ahmad County, Kohgiluyeh and Boyer-Ahmad Province, Iran. At the 2006 census, its population was 85, in 14 families.

References 

Populated places in Boyer-Ahmad County